Bidyashagar Singh Khangembam (born 11 March 1998) is an Indian professional footballer who plays as a forward for Indian Super League club Kerala Blasters, on loan from Bengaluru.

Club career
Bidyashagar is a product of East Bengal' youth system. He was part of East Bengal U18 squad that had narrowly lost in the final of the 2016–17 I-League U18. He scored a total of 6 goals in the competition, which includes a goal each against Salgaocar in the semi final and AIFF Academy in the final. He represented West Bengal in the 2017–18 Santosh Trophy. He scored 4 goals in the tournament.

In August 2017 , He was promoted  into the senior squad for 2017–18 Calcutta Premier Division. Bidyasagar made his professional debut for East Bengal on 27 October 2018, in an I-League match against NEROCA, replacing goalscorer Enrique Esqueda for the final 2 minutes of a 0–2 victory at the Khuman Lampak Main Stadium.

TRAU
On 9 July 2020, Bidyashagar signed for  I-League club TRAU for the 2020–21 I-League season. Bidayashagar made his debut appearance for the club in I-League on 10 January 2020 against Real Kashmir which ended in 1–1 draw. On 24 January 2021, Bidyashagar scored his first goal  against Chennai City which ended 2–0 in favour of the Trau FC. He scored his next goal against Churchill Brothers on 29 January 2021 which ended in a 1–1 draw. On 24 February, Bidyashagar scored a brace against Indian Arrows.

He is the second only Indian player to score double hat tricks in a single season, by doing so in a match against Mohammedan and Real Kashmir during the 2020–21 I-League. He ended the season scoring 12 goals, and 1 assist from 15 matches. He was also the top goalscorer in the 2020–21 I-League season. Thus also becoming the fourth Indian player to finish as top scorer in a National League of the country after Bhaichung Bhutia, Raman Vijayan and Sunil Chhetri.

He left the club the season later, and joined the Indian Super League side Bengaluru FC.

Bengaluru 
On 28 July 2021, it was announced that Bidyashagar was signed by the Indian Super League club Bengaluru FC on a three-year deal. On 15 August 2021, he debuted for the club in a 10 win against Maldivian side Club Eagles in 2021 AFC Cup qualifying play-offs.

Kerala Blasters FC  
On 17 August 2022, Kerala  Blasters FC announced the signing of Bidyashagar Singh on loan from Bengaluru FC until the end of season. He made his Kerala Blasters debut on 7 October against East Bengal in a 3–1 win by coming as a substitute for Puitea in the 77th minute. He also provided an assist in that game for Ivan Kalyuzhnyi in 81st minute.

Career statistics

Club

Notes

Honours

Individual
I-League: Golden Boot (1): 2020–21 (12 Goals with TRAU FC)
I-League: Hero of the League (1): 2020–21

References

1998 births
Living people
Footballers from Manipur
Association football forwards
East Bengal Club players
TRAU FC players
I-League players
Indian footballers
Kerala Blasters FC players
Bengaluru FC players
Indian Super League players